The Armenian Powerlifting Federation is the regulating body of powerlifting in Armenia, governed by the Armenian Olympic Committee. The headquarters of the federation is located in Yerevan.

History
The Armenian Powerlifting Federation is currently led by president Levon Kocharyan. The Federation oversees the training of powerlifting specialists and organizes Armenia's participation in European and international level powerlifting competitions. The Federation also hosts powerlifting events throughout Armenia. The Federation is a full member of the International Powerlifting Federation and the European Powerlifting Federation.

See also 
 Armenian Weightlifting Federation
 Sport in Armenia
 Weightlifting in Armenia

References

External links 
Armenian Powerlifting Federation official website

Sports governing bodies in Armenia
Powerlifting